Dorena Reservoir (also Dorena Lake) is a reservoir on the Row River in Lane County, Oregon, United States.

The Dorena Dam in front of the reservoir was completed in 1949 as one of the 13 dams of the United States Army Corps of Engineers in the Willamette River's basin.

Set at the south end of the Willamette Valley and criss-crossed by the Coast Fork Willamette River and its tributary the Row River, the area was susceptible to periodic flooding from large rains and snow melts in the surrounding mountains prior to the construction of the dam.

In the 1940s the United States Army Corps of Engineers began construction of dams which created Cottage Grove Lake and Dorena Lake. Dorena Lake is a popular summer vacation destination. Amenities include Baker Bay Marina and Schwarz Park campground. Visitor estimates top 80,000 people annually.

See also 
 List of lakes in Oregon

References

External links

Cottage Grove at the Oral History Archive

Dams in Oregon
United States Army Corps of Engineers dams
Reservoirs in Oregon
Lakes of Lane County, Oregon
Buildings and structures in Lane County, Oregon
Dams completed in 1949
1949 establishments in Oregon